The Dead Kingdom is a novel by Geraldine Harris published in 1983.

Plot summary
The Dead Kingdom is book 3 of the "Seven Citadels" tetralogy.

Reception
Dave Langford reviewed The Dead Kingdom for White Dwarf #62, and stated that "evidently she planned the four books as a whole rather than writing blindly into the unknown or tacking extensions onto a self-contained novel. To all sequelholics I say, go thou and do likewise."

Reviews
Review by Raymond H. Thompson (1984) in Fantasy Review, August 1984

References

1983 novels